Chiasmia goldiei is a moth in the family Geometridae first described by Druce in 1882. It is found in Australia and Papua New Guinea.

The forewings are black, crossed in the middle by a wide orange band, the apex tipped with white. The hindwings are black, crossed from the costal margin to near the anal angle by a yellow band tapering almost to a point. The underside is the same as the upperside. The head, thorax and abdomen are black.

Subspecies
Chiasmia goldiei goldiei
Chiasmia goldiei imperifascia (Prout, 1931)

References

Moths described in 1882
Macariini